Apicalia is a genus of medium-sized sea snails, marine gastropod mollusks in the family Eulimidae.

Species

The species within this genus include:

 Apicalia angulata (Warén, 1981)
 Apicalia brazieri (Angas, 1877)
 Apicalia echinasteri (Warén, 1980)
 Apicalia gibba (A. Adams, 1862)
 Apicalia habei (Warén, 1980)
 Apicalia inflata (Tate & May, 1901)
 Apicalia ovata (Pease, 1860)
 Apicalia palmipedis (Koehler & Vaney, 1913)
 Apicalia sandwichensis (G.B. Sowerby II, 1866)
 Apicalia taiwanica (Kuroda, 1964)
 Apicalia tryoni (Tate & May, 1900)

Species brought into synonymy
 Apicalia biformis (G.B. Sowerby III, 1897): synonym of Echineulima biformis (Sowerby III, 1897)
 Apicalia cicatricosa (Warén, 1981): synonym of Annulobalcis cicatricosa (Warén, 1981)
 Apicalia guentheri (Angas, 1877): synonym of Stilifer guentheri (Angas, 1877)
 Apicalia holdsworthi (H. Adams, 1874): synonym of Vitreobalcis holdsworthi (H. Adams, 1874)
 Apicalia immaculata (Pritchard & Gatliff, 1900): synonym of Apicalia brazieri (Angas, 1877)
 Apicalia mabuti (Nomura & Hatai, 1935): synonym of Parvioris fulvescens (A. Adams, 1866)
 Apicalia micans (Tenison Woods, 1875): synonym of Eulima tenisoni (Tryon, 1886)
 Apicalia sowerbyi (Barnard, 1963): synonym of Parvioris sowerbyi (Barnard, 1963)

References

 Adams A. (1862). On some new species of Mollusca from Japan. Annals and Magazine of Natural History (3) 9: 295-298

External links
 To World Register of Marine Species

Eulimidae